Aquaemermis is a genus of nematodes belonging to the family Mermithidae.

Species:
 Aquaemermis macrocarpus Rubzov, 1979 
 Aquaemermis mirabilis Rubzov, 1973

References

Mermithidae